The Midwest Hornet is an American autogyro that was designed by Don Shoebridge and made available by Midwest Engineering & Design in the form of free plans for amateur construction.

Design and development
The Hornet is a development of the Taggart GyroBee and was introduced in 1997. It features a single main rotor, a single-seat, open cockpit without a windshield, tricycle landing gear and a twin cylinder, air-cooled, two-stroke, single-ignition  Rotax 447 engine in pusher configuration. The  Rotax 503 engine can also be fitted.

The aircraft fuselage is made from bolted-together aluminum tubing, while the landing gear and flight controls are fabricated from 4130 steel. Without a pre-rotator fitted the Hornet requires  to become airborne.

Specifications (Hornet)

See also

References

External links
Official website archives on archive.org
Hornet plans

Hornet
1990s United States sport aircraft
Homebuilt aircraft
Single-engined pusher autogyros